Pseudecheneis is a genus of sisorid catfishes native to Asia.

Species
There are currently 19 recognized species in this genus:
 Pseudecheneis brachyurus W. Zhou, X. Li & Y. Yang, 2008
 Pseudecheneis crassicauda H. H. Ng & Edds, 2005
 Pseudecheneis eddsi H. H. Ng, 2006
 Pseudecheneis gracilis W. Zhou, X. Li & Y. Yang, 2008
 Pseudecheneis immaculatus X. L. Chu, 1982
 Pseudecheneis koladynae Anganthoibi & Vishwanath, 2010
 Pseudecheneis longipectoralis W. Zhou, X. Li & Y. Yang, 2008
 Pseudecheneis maurus H. H. Ng & H. H. Tan, 2007
 Pseudecheneis paucipunctatus W. Zhou, X. Li & Y. Yang, 2008
 Pseudecheneis paviei Vaillant, 1892
 Pseudecheneis serracula H. H. Ng & Edds, 2005
 Pseudecheneis sirenica Vishwanath & Darshan, 2007
 Pseudecheneis stenura H. H. Ng, 2006
 Pseudecheneis sulcata (McClelland, 1842) (Sucker throat catfish)
 Pseudecheneis sulcatoides W. Zhou & X. L. Chu, 1992
 Pseudecheneis suppaetula H. H. Ng, 2006
 Pseudecheneis sympelvica T. R. Roberts, 1998
 Pseudecheneis tchangi (Hora, 1937)
 Pseudecheneis ukhrulensis Vishwanath & Darshan, 2007

Distribution
Pseudecheneis species are rheophilic fish that occur in the headwaters of major river drainages throughout South and Southeast Asia. They are found in the upper reaches of rivers throughout the Subhimalayan and Indochinese region. They are distributed in the Ganges and Brahmaputra drainages of northern India and Nepal and eastwards to the Ailao Mountains along the upper Red River drainage of Vietnam and the Annamese Cordillera. P. maurus represents the first record of the genus on the rivers draining to the eastern face of the Annamese Cordillera.

Description
Pseudecheneis species are easily distinguished among sisorids in having a thoracic adhesive apparatus consisting of a series of transverse ridges (laminae) separated by grooves (sulcae). The dorsal and pectoral fins have one spine each. The head is short and anteriorly depressed with a sharp snout and small mouth. The lips are thick, fleshy, and papillate. The body is elongate, from moderately to greatly depressed. The eyes are small and dorsally-located. The skin is smooth. Mouth small. The maxillary barbels are very short. The mandibular barbels are papillate. The gill openings are narrow. Paired fins are plaited to form an adhesive apparatus.

References

Sisoridae
Freshwater fish genera
Fish of China
Fish of India
Fish of Nepal
Fish of Vietnam
Catfish genera
Taxa named by Edward Blyth